José Policarpo Rodríguez was a surveyor, scout, and Methodist preacher in Bandera, Texas. He was born in Zaragoza, Coahuila, Mexico on January 26, 1829 and died in Poteet, Texas on March 22, 1914.

References 

1829 births
1914 deaths
Mexican Methodists
People from Coahuila
People from Bandera, Texas